The Battle of Margate, also known as the Battle of Cadzand (not to be confused with the 1337 Battle of Cadzand), was a naval battle that took place 24–25 March 1387 during the Caroline War phase of the Hundred Years' War between an English fleet and a Franco-Castilian-Flemish wine fleet.

The battle ended in an English victory; many ships were captured and a vast haul of booty was acquired which included 8,000–9,000 tuns of wine.

Background
In October 1386, Richard II’s so-called Wonderful Parliament approved a commission which began gathering men and ships for a descent (amphibious assault) on Flanders. This was aimed at provoking an insurrection that would replace the government of Philip the Bold with a pro-English regime. It was also hoped this would dispel any French invasion attempt on England. On 10 December, Richard, Earl of Arundel, a member of the commission, was appointed admiral; a week later, the earl indented with the Crown to serve with 2,500 men for three months beginning on 1 March 1387.

On 16 March, Arundel arrived at Sandwich, where he took command of a fleet of sixty ships. Intending to invade England, the French and Castilians had gathered an army of thirty thousand men and a fleet of twelve hundred vessels at Sluis (Sluys) in the previous autumn. Philip the Bold, who was the driving force in Charles VI's minority government, suddenly fell ill and so the expedition was cancelled and the fleet dispersed. Many ships of the fleet however were still maintained and put to use in convoys for trading ships.

Battle
On 24 March 1387 Arundel's fleet sighted part of a French fleet of around 250–360 vessels commanded by Sir Jean de Bucq. This fleet included contingents of Flemish and Castilian vessels, many of which were also carrying wine from La Rochelle to Sluis. Although significantly larger than Arundel's flotilla, De Bucq's fleet was inferior in both manpower and armaments, having an inadequate complement of soldiers to defend it from the English attack. As the English attacked, a number of Flemish vessels deserted the fleet and from there a series of battles commenced from Margate into the channel towards the Flemish coast. The first engagement, off Margate itself, was the largest action and forced the allied fleet to flee with the loss of many ships.

The battle took place mostly in the Southern North Sea, while the two fleets were on the move, and Cadzand where the Franco-Castilian-Flemish fleet was finally defeated by the English. More French and Castilian ships were sunk or captured.  Arundel pursued the remnants of the fleet to Sluis where he arrived two days later. He penetrated into the outer anchorage and captured seven more ships with another eleven more burnt or sunk in the harbour. The English set up a blockade which lasted more than two weeks; they stopped and seized incoming vessels. However instead of holding the port, which was virtually undefended, the earl put landing parties ashore to burn and plunder coastal villages and seize rich prisoners for ransom. More booty was captured, but the Flemish uprising never materialised.

On 14 April, with supplies running low and his men falling ill, Arundel returned to England. In total over a dozen ships were sunk or burned, and sixty eight ships captured including three heavily laden Castilian carracks. De Bucq was captured and promptly sent to the Tower of London.

Aftermath
After refitting, the earl sailed to Brittany, where he resupplied the besieged garrison at Brest, but failed to effect a reconciliation with John IV, Duke of Brittany. Arundel had won a major victory, and ended the threat of a French and Castilian invasion for the next decade and damaged their naval capabilities. The barrels were carried to London, where they were sold for a fraction of the normal price and won much popularity for Arundel.

Margate was the last major naval battle of the Caroline War phase of the Hundred Years' War.  It destroyed France's chance of an invasion of England for at least the next decade.

References
Citations

Books
 
 
 
 
 
 
 

Websites
 

1380s in England
1380s in France
Conflicts in 1387
Naval battles of the Hundred Years' War
Battles of the Hundred Years' War
Margate
Naval battles involving England
Naval battles involving France
Naval battles involving Castile
Naval battles of the Middle Ages
Hundred Years' War, 1369–1389